Pregnadienedione (PDD), or pregna-4,20-dien-3,6-dione, is a steroid and pherine, or synthetic pheromone. PDD has been found to activate the vomeronasal organ in men. Moreover, inhalation by men has been found to affect autonomic and central function and to lower luteinizing hormone and testosterone levels, while inhalation by women has few or no effects.

See also
 List of neurosteroids § Pheromones and pherines
 This article discusses the male human vomeronasal organ (VNO) with pregna-4,20-diene-3,6-dione

References

Neurosteroids
Pherines
Pregnanes